The Other Side, Other Side, or Otherside may refer to:

Film, television and radio

Films
 The Other Side (1931 film), a German film directed by Heinz Paul
 The Other Side a 1999 film by director Peter Flinth
 The Other Side (2000 film), a Spanish drama film
 The Other Side (2006 film), an action-horror film directed by Gregg Bishop
 The Other Side, a 2010 short film starring Abigail Mavity
 The Other Side (2012 film), a short film directed by Muhammad Danish Qasim
 The Other Side (2015 film), a French-Italian documentary film on Louisiana, U.S.
 Ferocious Planet or The Other Side, a 2011 science fiction TV movie
 Poltergeist II: The Other Side, a 1986 horror film

Television and radio series
 The Other Side with Steve Godfrey, an American radio show
 The Other Side, a 1992 UK one-off TV drama written by David Ashton
 The Other Side, a 1994-95 American show on the NBC Daytime schedule

Television episodes
 "The Other Side" (Grimm)
 "The Other Side" (The Handmaid's Tale)
 "The Other Side" (Hercules: The Legendary Journeys)
 "The Other Side" (The Outer Limits)
 "The Other Side" (Stargate SG-1)
 "The Other Side" (The Walking Dead)

Literature 
 The Other Side (comics), a Vertigo comic by Jason Aaron and Cameron Stewart
 The Other Side (novel), a 2013 novel by Faraaz Kazi and Vivek Banerjee
 The Other Side (play) or The Other Shore, a 1990 play by Gao Xingjian
 The Other Side (Pike book), a 1968 occult book by Bishop James Pike
 The Other Side (Woodson book), a 2001 children's book by Jacqueline Woodson
 The Other Side: The Secret Relationship Between Nazism and Zionism, a 1984 book by Mahmoud Abbas
 The Other Side (El Otro Lado), a 1995 poetry collection by Julia Álvarez
 The Other Side (Die andere Seite), a 1908 fantastic novel by Alfred Kubin

Music

Albums 
 The Other Side (1927 album), 1990
 The Other Side (Alastis album), 1996
 The Other Side (Billy Ray Cyrus album), 2003
 The Otherside (album) by Cam, 2020
 The Other Side (Charlie Major album), 1993
 The Other Side (Chris Hillman album), 2005
 The Other Side (Chuck Brown and Eva Cassidy album), 1992
 The Other Side (Farmer Boys album), 2004
 The Other Side (Gary Jenkins album), 2007
 The Other Side (Gothminister album), 2017
 The Other Side (Lucy Diakovska album), 2005
 The Other Side (Lynden David Hall album), 2000
 Otherside (Oliver Lake album), 1988
 The Other Side (The Outhere Brothers album), 1998
 The Other Side (Sarah Geronimo album), 2005
 The Other Side (Tonight Alive album), 2013
 The Other Side (Tord Gustavsen album), 2018
 The Other Side (Wynonna Judd album), 1997
 The Other Side, by Martha Byrne, 2006
 The Other Side - The Best of Dexter Freebish, by Dexter Freebish, 2009
 The Other Side, by Nektar, 2020

EPs
 The Other Side (Godsmack EP), 2004
 The Other Side (Kate Voegele EP), 2003
 The Other Side (Nina Sky EP), 2010

Songs 
 "The Other Side" (Aerosmith song), 1989
 "The Other Side" (Charlie Major song), 1994
 "The Other Side" (David Gray song), 2002
 "The Other Side" (Jason Derulo song), 2013
 "The Other Side" (Paul van Dyk song), 2005
 "The Other Side" (Pendulum song), 2008
 "The Other Side" (SZA and Justin Timberlake song), 2020
 "Otherside", by the Red Hot Chili Peppers, 2000
 "The Other Side", by Afro Celt Sound System from Seed, 2003
 "The Other Side", by Alana Grace from Break the Silence, 2007
 "The Other Side", by Aleksander Denstad With, 2006
 "Otherside", by Beyoncé from The Lion King: The Gift, 2019
 "The Otherside", by Breaks Co-Op from The Sound Inside, 2005
 "The Other Side", by Bruno Mars from It's Better If You Don't Understand, 2010
 "The Otherside", by Bubba Sparxxx from The Charm, 2006
 "The Other Side", by Clannad from Banba, 1994
 "The Other Side", by Colton Dixon, 2017
 "The Other Side", by Conan Gray, 2016/2019
 "The Other Side", by the Dismemberment Plan from Change, 2001
 "The Other Side", by Evanescence from Evanescence, 2011
 "The Other Side", by Fey from Vértigo, 2002
 "The Other Side", by From First to Last from From First to Last, 2008
 "Other Side", by (hed)p.e. from Blackout, 2003
 "The Other Side", by Hugh Jackman and Zac Efron from The Greatest Showman: Original Motion Picture Soundtrack, 2017
 "The Other Side", by Lauren Alaina, 2019
 "Otherside", by Lena Raine from Minecraft: Caves & Cliffs, 2021
 "Otherside", by Macklemore & Ryan Lewis, 2009
 "The Other Side", by Matt Brouwer from Where's Our Revolution, 2009
 "The Other Side", by Mike Oldfield from Music of the Spheres, 2008
 "Other Side", by Pearl Jam, a B-side from the single "Save You", 2003
 "Otherside", by Perfume Genius from No Shape, 2017
 "The Other Side", by Public Service Broadcasting from The Race for Space, 2015
 "Other Side", by Rancid from Indestructible, 2003
 "The Otherside", by Red Sun Rising from Polyester Zeal, 2015
 "The Other Side", by Richard Marx from My Own Best Enemy, 2004
 "The OtherSide", by the Roots from Undun, 2011
 "Other Side", by the Scissor Sisters from Ta-Dah, 2006
 "The Other Side", by Sirenia from Nine Destinies and a Downfall, 2007
 "The Other Side", by Sloan from Parallel Play, 2008
 "The Other Side", by Tiny Tim from God Bless Tiny Tim, 1968
 "The Other Side", by Toto from Kingdom of Desire, 1992
 "Other Side", by Zachariah Selwyn

Performers 
 The Other Side, a 1960s American band featuring Boz Scaggs and Mac MacLeod

Religion 
 Qliphoth, also known as the Other Side, are representations of evil in Jewish mysticism

See also 
 The Othersiders, a 2009 American paranormal reality TV series
 On the Other Side (disambiguation)
 
 
 Flipside (disambiguation)